Maureen Jelagat Maiyo (28 May 1985 in Kapsowar) is a Kenyan athlete specialising in the 400 metres and 400 metres hurdles. She represented her country at the 2012 Summer Olympics as well as 2013 and 2015 World Championships.

International competitions

1Disqualified in the final

Personal bests
Outdoor
400 metres – 51.40 (Beijing 2015)
400 metres hurdles – 56.65 (Nairobi 2011)

References

Kenyan female hurdlers
Living people
People from Elgeyo-Marakwet County
Olympic athletes of Kenya
Athletes (track and field) at the 2012 Summer Olympics
Athletes (track and field) at the 2016 Summer Olympics
1985 births
Athletes (track and field) at the 2010 Commonwealth Games
Athletes (track and field) at the 2014 Commonwealth Games
Athletes (track and field) at the 2018 Commonwealth Games
Commonwealth Games competitors for Kenya
World Athletics Championships athletes for Kenya
Athletes (track and field) at the 2011 All-Africa Games
African Games competitors for Kenya